Astropanax is a genus of flowering plants in the family Araliaceae, native to Tropical Africa, Madagascar, and other Indian Ocean islands. It was resurrected from Schefflera in 2017.

Species
The following species are accepted:

Astropanax abyssinicus 
Astropanax barteri 
Astropanax evrardii 
Astropanax goetzenii 
Astropanax humblotianus 
Astropanax kivuensis 
Astropanax mannii 
Astropanax monophyllus 
Astropanax myrianthus 
Astropanax polysciadius 
Astropanax procumbens 
Astropanax stolzii 
Astropanax tessmannii 
Astropanax urostachyus 
Astropanax volkensii

References

Araliaceae
Apiales genera